Amberzine is a magazine that was published by Phage Press that covered The Chronicles of Amber books, the Amber Diceless Roleplaying Game, and associated material.

Publication history
Phage Press published Amberzine #1 (March 1992) shortly after Amber Diceless Roleplaying Game was released. The digest-sized magazine focused on inspirational material, like character diaries and discussions of elements of the Amber universe. One to three issues per year were published from 1992–1997 and the magazine was known for publishing an original Roger Zelazny Amber short story, "The Salesman's Tale," in Amberzine #6 (February 1994). Matt Howarth wrote and drew a Bugtown/Amber comic crossover called "Amber Raves of Pain," which appeared in Amberzine #6 (February 1994) through #9 (January 1997). Erick Wujcik kept Amberzine going until 1997, when he moved into computer games, and then published Amberzine #11 (2003) several years later; after he decided not to be a publisher anymore, Phage published a final quadruple-sized Amberzine #12–15 (2005) to fulfill its obligation to subscribers and to publish all the final material that Wujcik had left.

Reception
In the September 1992 edition of Dragon (Issue #185), Rick Swan reviewed the premiere issue of Amberzine and commented, "As is the case with most fan publications, the writing and graphics range from adequate to amateur, but what the magazine lacks in slickness it more than makes up for in enthusiasm."

Two years later, in the September 1994 edition of Dragon (Issue #209), Lester Smith called the magazine "an entertaining read, and a great source of ideas of Amber campaigns."

Three issues later, in the December 1994 edition of Dragon (Issue #212), although Allen Varney singled out Issue #5 of Amberzine for reprinting The Dark World by Henry Kuttner and C.L. Moore, he pointed out that the magazine "has become almost entirely game-free... and now serves more as a good but pricey general 'zine for Amber fans."

Reviews
White Wolf Magazine #38 (1993)

References

Defunct science fiction magazines published in the United States
Fanzines
Irregularly published magazines published in the United States
Magazines established in 1992
Magazines disestablished in 2005
The Chronicles of Amber